Michel George Malti (November 7, 1895 - May 1978) was an American electrical engineer, known for his work in circuit analysis.  He was born in Deir el Qamar, in modern-day Lebanon and died in Miami, Florida.
He graduated from the Syrian Protestant college (1915) and from Georgia Tech (1922), before joining Cornell University as an instructor and student, earning a M.Sc. (1924) and Ph.D. (1927), all degrees  in electrical engineering.

He continued to serve as research assistant and faculty member in civil engineering and as a professor in electrical engineering until his retirement (1962), spending sabbaticals at the University of Puerto Rico (1947) and the University of Roorkee in India (1955–57). In 1939  Malti and Fritz Herzog solved an important electric power problem on balancing dynamos, which had remained unsolved since the days of Michael Faraday a century before.
He later supervised research on 3D-modeling of Eddy currents.  Malti was an IEEE Fellow.

Works
Circuit analysis (Wiley, 1930).  Translated into Russian.

Notes

American electrical engineers
American University of Beirut alumni
Fellow Members of the IEEE
Georgia Tech alumni
Cornell University College of Engineering alumni
Cornell University faculty
Lebanese engineers
American people of Lebanese descent
1895 births
1978 deaths
20th-century American engineers